Maxwell Kaeser (born May 15, 2003) is an American race car driver.

Racing career

Early career 
Kaeser began karting at the age of 4 at G&J Kartway. He began running national events at the age of 7 competing in various cadet and sportsman classes from 2011 to 2014. In 2018 Kaeser made the full time transition to cars competing in SCCA Divisional Formula F, clinching the 2018 Rocky Mountain Division SCCA Formula F Championship, 2018 Rocky Mountain Division SCCA Rookie of the Year Award, 2019 Rocky Mountain Division SCCA Formula F Championship, and 2019 SCCA Mid-States Majors Conference Championship.

USF2000 
In 2019 Kaeser participated in the Chris Griffis Memorial Test with Miller Vinatieri Motorsports. In late 2019 it was announced that he would continue with the team for the 2020 season.

Racing record

Career summary 

* Season still in progress

Motorsports career results

American open–wheel racing results

U.S. F2000 Championship 

* Season still in progress

References 

2003 births
Living people
American racing drivers